The trace in semiotics is a concept developed by Jacques Derrida in Writing and Difference to denote the history that a sign carries with it as the result of its use through time. Words like "black", for example, carry the trace of all their previous uses with them, making them sensitive, loaded words when used in any context. The trace then reveals the possibility for alternative interpretation of concepts, regardless of how carefully articulated they may be, whenever they are expressed in language.

See also
Trace (deconstruction)
Context (language use)
Connotation

Semiotics